Dig is the debut album by the Canadian rock band I Mother Earth, released by Capitol and EMI on August 10, 1993. The album was certified Gold in Canada in its initial run, and stands at platinum today.  It also won a Juno Award in 1994 for Best Hard Rock Album.

The album was noted for its metallic sound, balanced with psychedelic-style lyrics and instrumentals, and further backed by Latin percussion. The latter two were often brought into play during lengthy jam sessions.

Personnel
Edwin – vocals
Jagori Tanna – guitars, backing vocals, bass (actual performer)
Bruce Gordon – bass (credited)
Christian Tanna - drums

Additional musicians
Luis Conte – percussion
Armando Borg – percussion
Mike Finnigan – Hammond B3 organ

Track listing
(All songs written by "I Mother Earth", later revealed to be Jagori and Christian Tanna)

In other media

 "Rain Will Fall" and "Levitate" appeared on the soundtrack for the 2003 video game True Crime: Streets of LA
 "Levitate" is a downloadable track available for the games in the Rock Band series, being also featured in the Metal Track Pack.

References

1993 albums
I Mother Earth albums
Albums produced by Mike Clink
Juno Award for Rock Album of the Year albums